is a horizontally scrolling shoot 'em up arcade game released by Konami in 1988. It used a "layered scrolling" background, a new 2D graphics technique at the time. The game spawned a sequel, Thunder Cross II, in 1991. Owing to several similarities, Space Manbow (1989) may also be considered a spin-off.

In 2007, Thunder Cross was included as part of the Oretachi Geasen Zoku Sono budget series on the PlayStation 2 in Japan. It was later released as part of the Arcade Archives series on PlayStation 4 in Japan in 2017 and Nintendo Switch worldwide in 2021, and was added to Konami's Arcade Classics Anniversary Collection for PlayStation 4, Xbox One, Steam, and Nintendo Switch in 2019.

Gameplay
Thunder Cross is a classic horizontal shooter with seven stages. Players control the Thunder fighter with up to four "options", which arrange up and down vertically and attack at the player's will. Three weapons are selectable ranging from the Vulcan shot to the Laser and the Boomerang shot (which doubles as a ricochet weapon). End-of-level bosses were present and, typical of a Konami shooter, Thunder Cross forced the player to beat the game twice in a harder Loop of the first seven levels.

Plot
Taking place in the future of space colonization, the planet Haniamu IV is under attack from a relentless, unknown military force known only as Black Impulse. The strongest Earth ships capable of stopping the total conquering of the planet are the Blue Thunder M-45 (player 1) and its earlier make the Red Thunder M-24 (player 2).

Soundtrack
 Thunder Cross Konami Arcade Game Soundtrack was released for Soundtrack CD on May 21, 1989 in Japan, and it also contain Ajax, Salamander, Hot Chase and Gradius II. It was also reprinted on May 21, 1993.
 An ending music for arcade Thunder Cross was a part of Konami Ending Collection, which was released for CD soundtrack on October 21, 1991.
 The Tracks 30 to 42 from Thunder Cross, which contain an CD Soundtrack MIDI POWER ver.4.0, were released on March 24, 1994 in Japan.
 In addition, disc 5 of Konami Music Masterpiece Collection, which was released on October 1, 2004, is devoted to Thunder Cross.

Reception 
In Japan, Game Machine listed Thunder Cross on their December 1, 1988 issue as being the second most-successful table arcade unit at the time.

References

1988 video games
Arcade video games
Konami franchises
Konami games
Horizontally scrolling shooters
PlayStation 2 games
Konami arcade games
Video games developed in Japan